Dmitry Pavlovich Pilchikov (October 26 (November 7, New Style) 1821, Kherson Governorate, Russian Empire – 5 October (October 17 New Style) 1893, Kharkov, Russian Empire) was a Ukrainian pan-slavist, civic and cultural activist, teacher, and a member of the Ukrainian national revival society known as the Brotherhood of Saints Cyril and Methodius.

Life 
Dmitry Pilchikov belonged to Russian nobility from the Kherson Governorate. In 1863 he graduated from the historical-philological faculty of the St. Vladimir University of Kiev. After that he worked as assistant librarian in the same University in Kiev. In 1846–1864 years he taught at the Poltava Cadet Corps. 1846 he joined the so-called Brotherhood of Saints Cyril and Methodius.

In 1860-1870s took part in the National democratic movement, he was a member and active advocate Ukrainophilism in the Governorate of Poltava. In the 1870s maintained contacts with the Galician public and cultural figures, and with Mykhailo Drahomanov.

In 1873 while in Lviv, Pilchikov gave money to Elisabeth Miloradovic (aunt of Pavlo Skoropadsky) on creation of the literary society of Taras Shevchenko (later known as Shevchenko Scientific Society).

He died on October 5 (October 17, New Style), 1893 in Kharkov (present-day Kharkiv, Ukraine).

Dmitry Pilchikov was father of prominent Russian physicist, inventor, and geologist Nikolay Pilchikov.

External links 
 in ukrainian 
 Dmytro Pylchykov at the Encyclopedia of Ukraine

Ukrainian democracy activists
1821 births
1893 deaths
Ukrainian philanthropists
Ukrainian nationalists
People from Kherson Governorate
Taras Shevchenko National University of Kyiv alumni
Ukrainian people in the Russian Empire
Brotherhood of Saints Cyril and Methodius members
19th-century philanthropists